Pseudolaubuca engraulis is a species of freshwater ray-finned fish from the family Cyprinidae, the carps and minnows from south east Asia. It occurs in the Zhu Jiang, Yangtze, Yellow rivers and their drainages in China.

References

Cyprinid fish of Asia
Pseudolaubuca
Fish described in 1925